Crocidocnemis is a genus of moths of the family Crambidae.

Species
Crocidocnemis pellucida Warren, 1889
Crocidocnemis pellucidalis (Möschler, 1890)

References

Spilomelinae
Crambidae genera
Taxa named by William Warren (entomologist)